American International University may refer to:

American International University-Bangladesh, a university in Dhaka, Bangladesh
American International University West Africa, a university in the Gambia
Richmond, The American International University in London, a university in Richmond, London

See also
American InterContinental University, an international for-profit university
American International College, a college in Springfield, Massachusetts
American International Medical University, a medical school in Saint Lucia
American University (disambiguation)
International American University, an for-profit Christian university in California
International American University College of Medicine, a medical school in Saint Lucia
International University (disambiguation)
Pacific Western University (Hawaii), a defunct, unaccredited university in Hawaii also called American PacWest International University